The Arraglen Ogham Stone is an ogham stone (CIIC 145) and a National Monument located in County Kerry, Ireland.

Location

Arraglen ogham stone is located in a saddle between Mount Brandon and Masatiompan.

History

This stone was erected as a grave marker, with inscription in Primitive Irish, some time in c. AD 550–600.

Description

The stone is sandstone, 191 × 38 × 20 cm. The inscription reads QRIMITIR RO/Ṇ[A]/ṆN MAQ̣ COMOGANN ("of the priest [cruimther] Rónán son of Comgán"). It contains a circled cross.

References

National Monuments in County Kerry
Ogham inscriptions
Buildings and structures completed in the 6th century
6th-century inscriptions